James W. Watson was a member of the Wisconsin State Assembly during the 1889 and 1891 sessions. Watson represented the 2nd District of Fond du Lac County, Wisconsin. He was a Democrat. Watson was born on February 14, 1849, in Roxburghshire, Scotland.

References

People from the Scottish Borders
Scottish emigrants to the United States
1849 births
Year of death missing
Democratic Party members of the Wisconsin State Assembly